Kenneth Daniel Scott (born May 11, 1930) is an American politician.

Kenneth Scott was born in Mason City, Iowa on May 11, 1930, to parents Walter and Hattie Scott. He graduated from Rockwell High School in 1948, which later merged into the Rockwell–Swaledale Community School District. Scott later served as president of the school board for the neighboring Meservey–Thornton Community School District, as well as on several agricultural organizations. Outside of politics, Scott was a farmer and auctioneer.

A Democrat, Scott was elected to the Iowa House of Representatives in 1970 for District 18, which then included his home county. He won election to the Iowa Senate in 1972, representing District 6 and again in 1986, this time for District 15.

References

1930 births
Living people
20th-century American politicians
People from Mason City, Iowa
Democratic Party members of the Iowa House of Representatives
Democratic Party Iowa state senators
School board members in Iowa
Farmers from Iowa
American auctioneers